Dan H. Branch (born March 5, 1958) is an American politician who served as the Texas State Representative for the 108th district from 2003 to 2015. A member of the Republican Party, he represented part of Dallas. On July 25, 2013, Branch officially announced his candidacy for Texas Attorney General in the 2014 Republican primary election, in which he was defeated by Ken Paxton.

Biography

Legislative tenure
Branch won the seat in 2002, when the incumbent Republican Kenn George stepped down after two terms to run unsuccessfully in the Republican primary for Texas land commissioner, losing to Jerry E. Patterson, then a state senator from Houston. The 2002 race was Branch's first for state office. He won ever election thereafter until 2014, when he ran for attorney general.

Branch served as chairman of the House Committee on Higher Education from 2009 to 2014 and served on the Calendars, Elections and Redistricting Committees, as well as the House Select Committee on State Sovereignty.  Branch also serves on the Legislative Budget Board.  Prior to the 81st Session, he served three terms as the Chair of Budget and Oversight on House Public Education Committee and served as Vice Chair of the Appropriations Subcommittee on Education.

In 2009, Branch was selected by Texas House members from eleven north Texas counties to co-chair the Dallas Area Legislative Delegation (DALD), at the delegation's first meeting of the 81st session. Branch replaced retired member Fred Hill (R-Richardson) as the Republican co-chair. He was re-elected in 2011 to serve as co-chair.

During the 81st legislative session, Branch was the author of House Bill 51, also known as the "Tier One Universities" Bill.  The bill announced that seven so-called emerging research universities would compete for extra funding in hopes of joining the University of Texas at Austin and Texas A&M University as nationally recognized research institutions. These seven schools include the University of North Texas, the University of Texas at Dallas, the University of Texas at Arlington, the University of Texas at El Paso, the University of Texas at San Antonio, the University of Houston and Texas Tech University.  After signing HB 51 into law, Governor Rick Perry said "[House Bill 51] will go down in the history books as one that truly is improving education in our state."

Campaign for Texas Attorney General
On July 14, 2013, Texas Attorney General Greg Abbott announced his intention to run for Governor of Texas in the 2014 Texas gubernatorial election. On July 25, 2013, Dan Branch officially announced his candidacy in the 2014 election.

Shortly following the launch of his campaign, Branch received the endorsement of six of Attorney General Greg Abbott's top lieutenants, including former Solicitor General James C. Ho. Former Texas Supreme Court Chief Justice Thomas R. Phillips and former Texas Supreme Court Justices Craig T. Enoch, Harriet O'Neill and former United States Attorney General Alberto Gonzales endorsed Branch for attorney general.

A majority of the House Republican Caucus endorsed Branch in his bid for attorney general. Shortly after his announcement of candidacy for attorney general, Branch reported more than $4 million on hand, a considerably larger amount than that of his two opponents.

Community involvement

In the fall of 2008, Branch joined Dallas Mayor Tom Leppert and Dallas Independent School District Superintendent Dr. Michael Hinojosa in leading "Operation Comeback", a statewide effort to stop 50,000 students a year from dropping out of high school.

He sits on the board of the John Goodwin Tower Center for Political Studies at SMU.

Family life
Branch and his wife, Stacey, have five children: Daniel, Spencer, Catherine, Charles, and Sarah.  They have lived and worked in Dallas for almost three decades.

References

External links

1958 births
Living people
Politicians from San Antonio
People from Dallas
Douglas MacArthur High School (San Antonio) alumni
Dedman School of Law alumni
Georgetown University alumni
Texas lawyers
Republican Party members of the Texas House of Representatives
Affirmative action in the United States
21st-century American politicians